= 1898–99 Michigan State Spartans men's basketball team =

American college basketball season

1898–99 Michigan State Spartans men's basketball
- Conference: Independent
- Record: 0–2
- Home arena: Armory

The 1898–99 Michigan State Spartans men's basketball team represented Michigan State University (known as State Agricultural College at the time) during the 1898–99 college men's basketball season. The season marked the school's first season. There was no official coach for the team, and the team finished the season with an overall record of 0–2.

== Schedule ==
Date time, TV	Opponent	Result	Record	Site city, state
Regular season
Feb 27, 1899*	Olivet	L 6–7	0–1	Armory; East Lansing, MI
Mar 13, 1899*	at Olivet	L 6–15	0–2	
*Non-conference game. (#) Tournament seedings in parentheses. Source
